Flow Podcast is a Brazilian podcast founded by Bruno Monteiro Aiub (Monark) and Igor Coelho (Igor 3K) in 2018. The podcast is directed and produced by Gianluca Eugenio (Gianzão). The podcast has already interviewed several people, including politicians, digital influencers, among other celebrities. It is considered one of the most watched in the country, with more than 5 million subscribers on YouTube.

On February 8, 2022, Monark left the podcast due to a statement that was considered by many to be anti-Semitic.

History 
Before creating the podcast, Bruno Monteiro Aiub (Monark) and Igor Coelho (Igor 3K) had video game channels. However, according to the first, "gameplay never made so much money". In 2014, Igor created a video game channel where he played Grand Theft Auto, but he "[ends up] going crazy." Monark and Igor were "pissed off at life", with both agreeing that the Flow Podcast is "the fruit of hate" and "of depression". For the name of the podcast, Monark initially suggested the name "Cult Flow", but Igor said that only Flow would be better.

At first, Monark and Igor paid for all the costs of the Flow Podcast, but starting in February or March 2020, the show started to pay for itself. Since then, both have lived off the Flow Podcast alone, earning money from sponsorships, AdSense, and Twitch. In the future, they plan to make special episodes in North America. When asked if they were thinking of adapting Flow for radio or television, Igor replied that "we need freedom, if we don't have freedom, that's another show."

Description 
According to Monark, Flow is inspired by The Joe Rogan Experience by podcaster Joe Rogan. Also according to him, there is no agenda or conversation prior to the program. UOL and Exame said that Flow is noted for its informal style, resembling a "bar conversation". The podcast has a cuts channel, which only contains excerpts from the episodes.

Criticism

Xbox Mil Grau and statement on racism 

Between the end of May and the beginning of June 2020, members of the Xbox Mil Grau channel began to be accused mainly of racism after tweets and speeches in livestreams considered as such. Despite this, Flow invited the channel to the podcast, causing controversy; Monark stated that after the episode was published, Flow became "enemy number one" for some people. Later, during an appearance on The Noite com Danilo Gentili, from SBT, when asked if they would "[think] twice before calling someone" due to the controversy, Monark and Igor said no, adding that fear or controversy is not a criterion for whether or not to invite someone to the podcast.

In October 2021, the show lost its sponsorship of the iFood delivery app, after Monark asked on Twitter if "having a racist opinion is a crime". The company released a note in which it maintained that it repudiated "any type of prejudice or act of discrimination". The following month, the podcast and iFood jointly released a note stating that they would maintain occasional partnerships, but not sponsorship.

Defense of the existence of a Nazi party 
On February 7, 2022, during the episode that had the participation of federal deputies Kim Kataguiri (UNIÃO-SP) and Tabata Amaral (PSB-SP), presenter Monark defended the existence of a legalized Nazi party in Brazil.

In addition to advocating the creation of the Nazi party, he maintained that people should have the right to be "anti-Jewish". Tabata countered the opinion, saying that freedom of speech should not put the lives of others at risk, and that ideologies such as Nazism put entire groups at risk. Kim, in turn, stated that a Nazi party should not be banned. According to Kim, despite considering Nazism a "nefarious ideology", preventing public debate on extremist ideologies does not prevent the growth of extremist groups.

Repercussions 
The communicator's statements generated a reaction from Israeli entities, including the Holocaust Museum in Curitiba, the Brazilian Israelite Confederation (CONIB) and the Israeli Federation of São Paulo (FISESP). The Holocaust Museum mentioned a past comment by Monark, and invited him to visit the museum to realize "that Nazism went far beyond people exercising, in their words, the 'right to be idiots.' CONIB condemned the idea of a Nazi party in Brazil and the right to be anti-Jewish. FISESP repudiated the ideas presented by the communicator, stating that Monark demonstrates a lack of commitment to democracy and human rights. The German embassy in Brazil said that defending Nazism is not freedom of speech.

Several interviewees requested that episodes in which they were interviewed by Monark be removed from the air, such as Gabriela Prioli, Benjamin Back, MV Bill, Lucas Silveira and Ednaldo Pereira. Parties, politicians and STF ministers repudiated the communicator's statements. Companies that sponsored the channel or had already sponsored it issued notes of repudiation of the statements and ended contracts with the Flow channel. The Football Federation of the State of Rio de Janeiro (FFERJ) terminated the contract it had with Flow Sports Club (the group's sub-channel on sports matters) to broadcast the 2022 Carioca Championship. The day after the live, Monark came to speak saying that he was under the influence of alcohol and that the speech had been distorted.

On the same day, Estúdios Flow communicated through their social networks that Monark was no longer part of the group. Subsequently, Monark said that "I may have been wrong in the way I expressed myself, but what they are doing to me is an inhuman lynching". To which the Holocaust Museum replied: "Inhuman lynching is what they did to Moïse Kabagambe (...) You were wrong, so we reiterate our invitation! With an open heart! Come visit us, without fanfare!". On February 11, 2022, the Monark company denied any relationship with the youtuber, whose nickname is the brand name.

Performance 
Flow Podcast was frequently among the most watched podcasts in Brazil. The show debuted on Apple Podcasts' Top Podcasts chart on February 17, 2019, reaching the top of the chart on multiple occasions and on consecutive days — the first of which was on August 13, 2020.
Sergio Moro participated in an interview on Flow as part of his political strategy for the 2022 elections. The live reached 82K simultaneous viewers, losing to Lula's audience on the Podpah podcast (292K) and Casimiro on Twitch (545,6K). Jair Bolsonaro’s interview on August 8, 2022 reached a peak of more than 16.000.000 viewers, surpassing Lula’s on Podpah.

Members 
 Current
 Igor Coelho (Igor 3K) (2018–present)
 Former members
 Bruno Aiub (Monark) (2018–2022)

Television

Notes

References 

2018 establishments in Brazil
Audio podcasts